Nativa was a carbonated beverage created by the Coca-Cola Company. It was released in November 2003 in Argentina, and discontinued in August 2004. The flavor of this drink was Yerba mate.

The odd choice of flavor was based on the Argentine tradition of drinking mate, which also was the reason of the naming of the brand "Nativa" (native).

Not to be confused with Nativa Yerba Mate, USPTO trademarked brand of loose-leaf yerba mate from Brazil which is still in existence.

References

Coca-Cola brands